Michael Ebling (born 27 January 1967) is a German politician of the Social Democratic Party (SPD) who served as State Minister of the Interior in the government of Minister-President Malu Dreyer of Rhineland-Palatinate since 2022. From 2012 to 2022, he was the mayor of Mainz.

Early life and education
After passing the Abitur at Gonsbach-Gymnasium in 1986, Ebling served for 20 months in the civilian service, or Zivildienst, caring for the disabled. He then studied law at the University of Mainz, and took on a political career as assistant to Klaus Hammer, member of the Landtag of Rhineland-Palatinate and chairman of the regional SPD. Later, he worked as an advisor to the ministry of education, science, and culture of the State of Rhineland-Palatinate, joining the office of minister of State Jürgen Zöllner.

Political career
Ebling joined the SPD at the age of 16. He took an active part in the Mainz city council between 1994 and 2002, taking a lead position as his parliamentary group's spokesman for cultural affairs. He also was a member of the executive committee of his party's parliamentary group. Between 1995 and 2007 he was chairman of the SPD at Mombach, succeeding to Ursula Distelhut as a representative of the borough of Mainz-Mombach.

Ebling was elected vice president of his party's parliamentary group in 1998, only to be chosen as president in November 2008. He was elected full-time deputy mayor for social affairs, youth, health and housing in 2002, after his predecessor Malu Dreyer changed to the third cabinet of Minister-President Kurt Beck of Rhineland-Palatinate. Since 2006, Ebling joined the office of Doris Ahnen as Secretary of State in the ministry of education, science, and culture of Rhineland-Palatinate. In this position he is member of the external advisory board of the Graduate School of Excellence – Materials Science in Mainz.

Mayor of Mainz 
In a ballot on 25 March 2012 Michael Ebling was elected mayor of Mainz, gaining  58.2 percent of the votes cast against his competitor Günther Beck (Alliance '90/The Greens) who came out second with 41.8 percent. Ebling was successful with an election programme putting social aspects and education policy on top of the agenda. He is the first native from Mainz to be elected mayor of his home town since 1965. On 10 November 2019, Ebling was reelected as mayor of Mainz. He gained 55.2 percent of the votes.

In the negotiations to form a coalition government under the leadership of Chancellor Angela Merkel following the 2017 federal elections, Ebling was part of the working group on municipalities and rural areas, led by Reiner Haseloff, Kurt Gribl and Michael Groschek.

Other activities

Corporate boards
 Gas-Union GmbH, Deputy Chairman of the Supervisory Board
 Mainzer Stadtwerke AG, Ex-Officio Chairman of the Supervisory Board
 Sparkasse Mainz, Ex-Officio Chairman of the Supervisory Board
 Überlandwerk Groß-Gerau (ÜWG), Ex-Officio Chairman of the Supervisory Board
 Zentrale Beteiligungsgesellschaft der Stadt Mainz mbH (ZBM), Ex-Officio Chairman of the Supervisory Board

Non-profit organizations
 Business Forum of the Social Democratic Party of Germany, Member of the Political Advisory Board (since 2020)
 German Association of Local Utilities (VKU), President (since 2015)
 Johannes Gutenberg University Mainz, Member of the Board of Trustees
 Kunsthalle Mainz, Member of the Board of Trustees
 Max Planck Institute for Polymer Research, Member of the Board of Trustees
 Staatstheater Mainz, Ex-Officio Chairman of the Supervisory Board
 Stifterverband für die Deutsche Wissenschaft, Member of the Board of Trustees

Personal life
Ebling is out as gay.

References

External links 

 

1967 births
Living people
Mayors of Mainz
Social Democratic Party of Germany politicians
LGBT mayors of places in Germany
Gay politicians